James Ewart may refer to:
 James Oliver Ewart, British Army intelligence officer
 James Cossar Ewart, Scottish zoologist